The Cerro Tololo Inter-American Observatory (CTIO) is an astronomical observatory located on Cerro Tololo in the Coquimbo Region of northern Chile, with additional facilities located on Cerro Pachón about  to the southeast. The site was identified by a team of scientists from Chile and the United States in 1959, and it was selected in 1962. Construction began in 1963 and regular astronomical observations commenced in 1965. Construction of large buildings on Cerro Tololo ended with the completion of the Víctor Blanco Telescope in 1974, but smaller facilities have been built since then. Cerro Pachón is still under development, with two large telescopes (Gemini South and SOAR) inaugurated since 2000, and one in the early stages of construction (the Vera C. Rubin Observatory)

The principal telescopes at CTIO are the 4 m Víctor M. Blanco Telescope, named after Puerto Rican astronomer Víctor Manuel Blanco, and the 4.1 m Southern Astrophysical Research  Telescope, which is situated on Cerro Pachón. Other telescopes on Cerro Tololo include the 1.5 m, 1.3 m, 1.0 m, and 0.9 m telescopes operated by the SMARTS consortium. CTIO also hosts other research projects, such as PROMPT, WHAM, and LCOGTN, providing a platform for access to the southern hemisphere for U.S. and worldwide scientific research.

Organization 

CTIO is one of two observatories managed by NOIRLab, the other being Kitt Peak National Observatory (KPNO) near Tucson, Arizona. NOIRLab is operated by the Association of Universities for Research in Astronomy (AURA), which owns the property around the two peaks in Chile and at the headquarters in La Serena, Chile.  AURA also operates the Space Telescope Science Institute and the Gemini Observatory. The  Gemini South Telescope located on Cerro Pachón is managed by AURA separately from CTIO for an international consortium. The National Science Foundation (NSF) is the funding agency for NOIRLab.

The Small and Medium Research Telescope System (SMARTS) is a consortium formed in 2001 after NOAO, the predecessor to NOIRLab, announced it would no longer support anything smaller than two meters at CTIO. The member institutions of SMARTS now fund and manage observing time on four telescopes that fit that definition. Access has also been purchased by individual scientists. SMARTS contracts with NOIRLab to maintain the telescopes it controls at CTIO, and NOIRLab retains the right to 25% of the observing time, and Chilean scientists retain 10%. SMARTS began managing telescopes in 2003.

CTIOPI is the Cerro Tololo Interamerican Observatory Parallax Investigation. It began in 1999 and uses two telescopes at Cerro Tololo, the SMARTS 1.5 m reflector and the SMARTS 0.9 m reflector. The purpose of CTIOPI is to discover nearby red, white, and brown dwarfs that lurk unidentified in the solar neighborhood. The goal is to discover 300 new southern star systems within 25 parsecs by determining trigonometric parallaxes accurate to 3 milliarcseconds.

Telescopes 

 The  Víctor M. Blanco Telescope (Blanco 4m) was completed in 1974 and is very similar to the Nicholas U. Mayall Telescope that was completed at KPNO in 1973. Testing of the telescope and instruments lasted until the beginning of 1976 when science operations began. The Blanco 4m is the only telescope on Cerro Tololo managed directly by NOIRLab.
 The  Southern Astrophysical Research Telescope (SOAR) is an optical and near-infrared telescope located on Cerro Pachón. It was dedicated in 2004 and is managed by NOIRLab for an international consortium of which NOIRLab is a partner.

SMARTS telescopes 

 The  SMARTS Telescope is a Cassegrain reflector on an equatorial mount. Regular observations began in 1968.
 The  SMARTS Telescope is a Cassegrain reflector on an equatorial mount. It was built by M3 Engineering and Technology Corporation and used for the 2-micron All-Sky Survey (2MASS). It began operating in 1998 and was given to CTIO in 2001 after the survey was completed.
 The  SMARTS Yale Telescope is a closed-tube Cassegrain reflector built by Boller and Chivens. It was first installed in 1965 at the Bethany Observing Station of the Yale University Observatory. It was moved to CTIO in 1974. From 1998 to 2002, it was used by the Yale University–AURA–University of Lisbon–Ohio State University (YALO) consortium with a custom-built sensor. In 2004 it was integrated into SMARTS.
 The  SMARTS Telescope is a closed-tube Cassegrain reflector. It was installed at CTIO in 1966.

Tenant telescopes 
 The  Southeastern Association for Research in Astronomy (SARA) South Telescope is a reflecting telescope built by Boller and Chivens. Installed in 1968 for the International Planetary Patrol Program, it was owned and operated by Lowell Observatory. At some point control shift to CTIO, which lasted until 1996, after which Lowell used the telescope intermittently. It was refurbished by SARA and put back into use in 2010. Observing time is shared between the members of the SARA consortium. 
 The  Curtis-Schmidt Telescope is a Schmidt camera that was installed at CTIO in 1966. Previously, it was located at the University of Michigan's Portage Lake Observatory. It is currently used for the Michigan Orbital DEbris Survey Telescope (MODEST) project, which is part of NASA's program to detect and catalog orbital debris. Two-thirds of observing time was at the discretion of NOAO prior to 2001. From 1989 to 1995 it was used in part by the Calán/Tololo Survey. 
 The Wisconsin H-Alpha Mapper (WHAM) is a custom-built  telescope used to study the warm ionized medium. In 2009, it was moved to CTIO from KPNO, where it operated from 1996 to 2008.
 A  reflecting telescope built by Officina Stellare of Italy was installed in 2010 as part of the Chilean Automatic Supernova Search (CHASE). The project is run by the Center for Excellence in Astrophysics and Associated Technologies (CATA) of the University of Chile Department of Astronomy. The telescope will also be part of Global Robotic-telescopes Intelligent Array (GLORIA). It is located in the building that previously housed the Millimeter-wave Telescope.  The existing dome was replaced by a new clamshell-style dome as part of the project.  CHASE has used the PROMPT telescopes for 10% of the time since 2009.
 The Panchromatic Robotic Optical Monitoring and Polarimetry Telescopes (PROMPT) installation consists of five  Ritchey-Chrétien reflectors built by RC Optical Systems.  Each telescope is fitted with a filter and camera designed to observe gamma ray bursts at different wavelengths. When not observing an event, the telescopes are used remotely by public school students in North Carolina. Construction of six fully automated domes started in 2004 and the telescopes began operating in 2006.  The status of a sixth telescope, originally planned to observe at near-infrared wavelengths, is unclear. The building for a seventh PROMPT telescope, a larger  unit, was completed in 2011.
 The Global Oscillations Network Group (GONG) deployed an observing station to study helioseismology in 1995.
 Eight 40 cm telescopes, each equipped with a CCD camera sensitive to red optical and near-infrared light used by the MEarth Project.
 Las Cumbres Observatory Global Telescope Network operates three  and two  telescopes at Cerro Tololo. Construction of the domes began in 2010 and was completed in 2011. The telescopes were installed and commissioned in 2012.
 The Korean Microlensing Telescope Network (KMTNet), led by the Korea Astronomy and Space Science Institute (KASI), operates a  telescope as part network of three telescopes dedicated to detecting exoplanets. The large CCD camera was installed on the telescope in September of 2014.
 The Evryscope is a multiple-aperture (22x  telescopes) wide-field survey telescope taking approximately 5000 images per night.
 The  T80S telescope is operated by the Southern Photometric Local Universe Survey (S-PLUS) collaboration.

Former telescopes 
 The  Millimeter-wave Telescope is a Cassegrain reflector with a primary mirror made of machined aluminum, remachined in USA by Phelps-Dodge to a surface accuracy of lambda/400. It was installed at CTIO in 1982, and an identical telescope is located at the Center for Astrophysics  Harvard & Smithsonian. It was used for spectrometric mapping-surveys of the distribution of Carbon Monoxide at a rest-wavelength of 2.6 millimeters in molecular clouds in the third and fourth quadrants of the Milky Way, and in the Magellanic Clouds while at CTIO. In 2009, it was moved to the Chilean National Astronomical Observatory's campus on Cerro Calán near Santiago.
 A  telescope was transported to the summit on mules in 1961 to perform site testing. It was later installed in a dome at CTIO in 1965. Its dome was used by the Millimeter-wave Telescope beginning in 1982.
 A second  telescope was installed in 1965. It was removed at some point and the building was used for UCAC.
 A  astrograph was used by the USNO CCD Astrograph Catalog (UCAC) project from 1998 to 2001. It was located in one of the 16-inch telescope domes. After surveying the southern sky, it was moved to United States Naval Observatory Flagstaff Station to complete its mission.
 The Southern H-Alpha Sky Survey Atlas (SHASSA) operated at CTIO from 1997 to 2006 in its own small dome, which was dubbed El Enano ('the Dwarf') by the local staff. It was removed at the end of the project and donated to a school in La Serena.

Future telescopes 
 The Vera C. Rubin Observatory (LSST) is a  reflecting telescope under construction on Cerro Pachón. Construction began in 2011 and first light is expected in late 2015. It will be used for an astronomical survey similar to the 2MASS survey performed at CTIO. As with Gemini, the LSST will be managed separately from CTIO.. A smaller 1.4-meter support telescope for LSST will be built on an adjacent peak.

Other scientific projects 
 The Andes Lidar Observatory is a National Science Foundation project to measure the upper atmosphere above the Andes which uses several passive optical instruments.

Discoveries 
 

 

On the morning of Saturday, December 7, 2013, Luis González, a research assistant at the University of Chile, discovered what would later be confirmed as a supernova by José Maza, an astronomer at University of Chile and a researcher for CATA (Centro de Astrofísica y Tecnologías Afines or “Centre for Astrophysics and Related Technologies”). The supernova is the first discovery to be made by the CATA 500, a robotic telescope designed and operated by a Chilean team located in Santiago, approximately 500 kilometres to the south. It is part of the GLORIA project, which provides open access to astronomers from around the world to a network of remotely operated robotic telescopes.
The new supernova lies in the galaxy ESO 365-G16, located 370 million light years from Earth, and has a mass eight times that of the Sun.

Gomez's Hamburger, believed to be a young star surrounded by a protoplanetary disk, was discovered in 1985 on sky photographs obtained by Arturo Gomez, support technical staff at the Observatory.

Gallery

See also 
 List of astronomical observatories
 List of highest astronomical observatories
 Other observatories in Chile:
 Llano de Chajnantor Observatory 
Atacama Large Millimeter Array)
 Paranal Observatory
 Very Large Telescope
 Cerro Armazones Observatory
 Extremely Large Telescope
 La Silla Observatory
 MEarth Project
 MCELS (Magellanic Cloud Emission-line Survey)
 Tololo 1247-232 - One of only two known Lyman continuum photons emitters

References

External links 

Cerro Tololo Inter-American Observatory Home Page
SOAR Telescope Home Page
Gemini Observatory Home Page
Small and Moderate Aperture Research Telescope System (SMARTS)
Coordinates for Observatories on Cerro Tololo and Cerro Pachon 

Astronomical observatories in Chile
Minor-planet discovering observatories
Buildings and structures in Coquimbo Region
1962 establishments in Chile
NOIRLab